Hutto Independent School District is a public school district based in Hutto, Texas, United States. It is one of the fastest growing districts in Texas.

In addition to Williamson County, it covers parts of Travis County. 

In 2009, the school district was rated "academically acceptable" by the Texas Education Agency.

School Board
Dr. Celina Estrada Thomas - Superintendent
Eduardo Ramos - Deputy Superintendent
Todd Robison - Public Information Officer
Brandy Baker - Asst. Superintendent of School Support
Lisa Patterson - Asst. Superintendent of Human Resources
Phillip Boutwell - President
Byron McDaniel - Vice - President
Billie Logiudice - Secretary
Sheila Knapp - Board Member
Doug Gaul - Board Member
Connie Gooding - Board Member
Kelly Farmer - Board Member

2011 District Accountability Summary

Gold Performance Acknowledgment Key
++ = Acknowledged
NQ = Does Not Qualify

Total Count =   9

School Rankings in Texas (as of 2015)
Hutto High School 784/1226 
Farley Middle School  469/1802 
Hutto Middle School  1018/1802

Schools

High School (Grades 9-12)
Hutto High School (1999)
 Hutto Ninth Grade Center (2021)
http://www.greatschools.org/modperl/achievement/tx/3723#taks
Hutto High School received a "Recognized" rating for the 2009 TAKS testing

Middle School (Grades 6-8)
Hutto Middle School (2005) - Elizabeth Anderson - Principal 
Farley Middle School (2008) - Jorge Franco - Principal

Elementary Schools (Grades PK-5)
Cottonwood Creek Elementary School (2006)
Hutto Elementary School (1980)
Nadine Johnson Elementary School (Formerly Hutto Primary) (2003)
Ray Elementary School (2007)
Veterans Hill (2008)
Howard Norman Elementary (2016)
Benjamin "Doc" Kerley Elementary (2019)

References

External links
Hutto ISD

School districts in Williamson County, Texas
School districts in Travis County, Texas